This is a list of notable New Zealand Catholics. All additions should be sourced and ideally their faith or Catholic identity should be significant to their notability.

Activists 
Patricia Bartlett, former nun and social conservative. She founded the Society for Promotion of Community Standards.
Marilyn Pryor, served on the Executive Council of what is now called Voice for Life.

Artists and architects 
Francis Petre, architect of cathedrals

Businesspeople 
Charles Todd motor-industry pioneer and temperance activist; many in the Todd family were or are Catholics

Politicians 
 Jim Bolger, thirty-fifth Prime Minister of New Zealand
 Sir Charles Clifford, 1st Baronet (1813–1893), first Speaker of the New Zealand House of Representatives;
Peter Dignan, fifteenth Mayor of Auckland City
Bill English, thirty-ninth Prime Minister of New Zealand
Walter Lee, Auckland member of parliament
Michael Joseph Savage, twentythird Prime Minister of New Zealand
Heremia Te Wake, tribal leader and catechist
Joseph Ward, seventeenth Prime Minister of New Zealand
Frederick Weld, sixth Prime Minister of New Zealand

Religious

Clergy 

Fr. Douglas Al-Bazi, refugee from Islamism
Fr. Mark Beban, also a cricketer.
Fr. Felix Donnelly (1929-2019), social activist, writer, academic and radio talkback host
Rev. Fr. George Duggan, philosopher and centenarian
Fr. David Kennedy, astronomer and educator
 Bernard O'Brien SJ, Seminary professor.
Antony Sumich, F.S.S.P., New Zealander who was a former international Rugby Union and Cricket player for Croatia.   
Fr. Wiremu Te Awhitu, first Māori to be ordained

Religious sisters and nuns 
Mary St Domitille Hickey, historian, school principal, and reportedly the first New Zealand woman to be awarded a doctorate in literature
Mary Gonzaga Leahy, nun and hospital matron
Sister Mary Leo, music educator, Dame Commander of the Order of the British Empire
Sister Marie Roche, honoured for her work in a prison

Writers and journalists 
K. O. Arvidson, poet and academic
James K. Baxter, poet and convert who was offered a job composing catechetical material for the Catholic Education Board
Eileen Duggan (1894-1972), Poet.
Patrick Anthony Lawlor, writer known for the autobiographical work Old Wellington days, also worked for the Catholic Writers' Movement of New Zealand

References 

 
NZ
Catholics